VDNKh is a Moscow Metro station in Ostankinsky District, North-Eastern Administrative Okrug, Moscow, Russia. It is located on the Kaluzhsko-Rizhskaya Line, between Alekseyevskaya and Botanichesky Sad stations.

VDNKh was opened on 1 May 1958. The name stands for Exhibition of Achievements of the National Economy  (abbreviated VDNKh). The station features pylons faced with white marble and decorated with circular ventilation grilles.

VDNKh was designed by Nadezhda Bykova, I. Gokhar-Kharmandaryan, Ivan Taranov, and Yu. Cherepanov.

It is also one of the busiest stations, serving 107,377 passengers a day in 2009.

Originally, this station was planned to be opulently decorated in the manner of the other stations built in the 1950s, with mosaics by venerable artist Vladimir Favorsky along the insides of the arches between the pylons. However, in the wake of Nikita Khrushchev's attack on decorative "excessions", the place for mosaics, including existing mosaics as well, were crudely coated with incongruous thick green paint.

The original circular vestibule is located on the west side of Prospekt Mira, in front of the Space Obelisk.

In 1996, the station got an additional pavilion for entrance-exit needs at the southern side of the station.

It was the deepest station in Moscow Metro from 1958 until 1979.

Transfers 
Though not directly connected to VDNKh, Moscow Monorail station Vystavochny Tsentr is located within walking distance.

In popular culture 
VDNKh is featured as the home of Artyom, the main protagonist in the novel and video game Metro 2033.

The station was also featured in the tenth leg of The Amazing Race 13.

The station is in the first chapter of Night Watch (Lukyanenko novel).  The book refers to this station being one of the older stations.

References 

Moscow Metro stations
Railway stations in Russia opened in 1958
Exhibition of Achievements of National Economy
Kaluzhsko-Rizhskaya Line
Railway stations located underground in Russia